The former St. Anthony's Catholic Church is a redbrick historic Roman Catholic steepled church  complex located at 2222-2238 West Market Street in Louisville, Kentucky. Designed by noted local architect William H. Redin in the Gothic Revival style of architecture, it was built in 1887. After a disastrous fire in 1939 which caused extensive damage to all buildings in the complex except the rectory to the left of the church, architect Walter C. Wagner, Sr. designed the reconstruction of the complex which was done by Skilton and Sullivan Construction Company.  In 1978, the parish school was merged with St. Cecilia School and Our Lady of the Port Academy to form Community Catholic School on the St. Cecilia campus. On March 1, 1982, the complex was added to the National Register of Historic Places. In 2011, the Archdiocese of Louisville closed the church, merging its boundaries into those of the nearby Good Shepherd Parish.

References

Churches on the National Register of Historic Places in Kentucky
Gothic Revival church buildings in Kentucky
Roman Catholic churches completed in 1887
19th-century Roman Catholic church buildings in the United States
Roman Catholic churches in Louisville, Kentucky
National Register of Historic Places in Louisville, Kentucky
Organizations disestablished in 1987
1887 establishments in Kentucky